Denji is a Japanese word meaning "electromagnetic". It may refer to:

Denji (Chainsaw Man), the protagonist of the manga series Chainsaw Man
Denshi Sentai Denziman, a part of the Super Sentai franchise
Denji Sentai Megaranger, a part of the Super Sentai franchise
Denji Lightan, a character from the anime television series Golden Warrior Gold Lightan
Kudou Denji, a character from the manga series Abara
Denji Kuroshima (1898–1943), Japanese author